Stevinus is a lunar impact crater located in the southeast part of the Moon. To the southeast is the large crater Furnerius. Just to the northeast is Snellius and the Vallis Snellius crater valley. To the west-northwest lies Reichenbach. To the west-northwest of Stevinus is the tiny crater Stevinus A, a feature that possesses a small ray system and a displays a high albedo.

Stevinus has a high inner wall and a central peak at the midpoint of the interior floor. The inner walls are slumped, so that the side slopes down sharply, then more gradually. There are several small ridges on the floor, in addition to the peak. Due to its ray system, Stevinus is mapped as part of the Copernican System.

It is named for Simon Stevin, a 16th-century Belgian mathematician and engineer.

Satellite craters 

By convention these features are identified on lunar maps by placing the letter on the side of the crater midpoint that is closest to Stevinus.

References 

 
 

Impact craters on the Moon